Yevgeni "John" Yurievich Namestnikov (born October 9, 1971) is a Russian former professional ice hockey defenceman who spent parts of six seasons in the National Hockey League (NHL) and is currently an NHL amateur scout for the Toronto Maple Leafs. Namestnikov is the father of current NHL player Vladislav Namestnikov and brother-in-law of former NHL player Slava Kozlov.

Playing career
Namestnikov was drafted 117th overall by the Vancouver Canucks in the 1991 NHL Entry Draft. After spending two more seasons in Russia with CSKA Moscow he came to North America for the 1993–94 season.

Undersized for an NHL defender, Namestnikov compensated for his size by playing a hard-nosed physical game and was an excellent open-ice hitter. Called up midway through the 1993–94 season, he made an instant impact with his strong play through his first ten or so games, but faded and was returned to the American Hockey League. This pattern would continue throughout his four seasons in the Canuck organization - when called up, he would make a quick impact with his physical play, but his lack of size and sometimes questionable decision-making would catch up with him, and he'd find himself back in the AHL.

Namestnikov signed as a free agent with the New York Islanders for the 1997–98 season, but again found himself primarily in the minors, appearing in just two games for the Islanders in two seasons with the organization. After a brief stint in the system of the New York Rangers, Namestnikov was dealt to the Nashville Predators, where he played his final two NHL games in the 1999–2000 season. Following his release from Nashville in 2001, he returned to Russia where he played for five more seasons before retiring in 2006.

Namestnikov appeared in 43 NHL games, recording 9 assists and 24 penalty minutes. He also appeared in two playoff games for the Canucks without recording a point.

Scouting career
Namestnikov works as a scout for the Toronto Maple Leafs. Notable players he has scouted include Nikita Soshnikov and Yegor Korshkov.

Personal life
Namestnikov moved from Russia to Salt Lake City, Utah, in 1993 with his wife and eight-month-old son, Vladislav. Vladislav himself became a professional hockey player, playing for the New York Rangers, Ottawa Senators, Colorado Avalanche, Detroit Red Wings, Tampa Bay Lightning and currently the Winnipeg Jets.

Career statistics

Regular season and playoffs

International

References

External links

1971 births
Living people
Ak Bars Kazan players
Atlant Moscow Oblast players
Hamilton Canucks players
Hartford Wolf Pack players
HC CSKA Moscow players
HC Lada Togliatti players
HC MVD players
Lowell Lock Monsters players
Milwaukee Admirals players
Nashville Predators players
New York Islanders players
People from Arzamas
Russian ice hockey defencemen
Soviet ice hockey defencemen
Syracuse Crunch players
Torpedo Nizhny Novgorod players
Toronto Maple Leafs scouts
Utah Grizzlies (AHL) players
Vancouver Canucks draft picks
Vancouver Canucks players
Sportspeople from Nizhny Novgorod Oblast